is a constituency of the House of Councillors in the Diet of Japan (national legislature). It consists of Kagawa Prefecture and elects two Councillors, one every three years by a first-past-the-post system for a six-year term. In the first election in 1947, Kagawa like all districts used single non-transferable vote to elect both its Councillors in one election.

Single-member districts (ichinin-ku) for the House of Councillors often play a decisive role for the outcome of elections as little swing in votes is required to achieve a change of the Councillors elected there. Kagawa in predominantly rural Shikoku has in most elections voted for candidates from the Liberal Democratic Party (LDP); but in 1950, 1965, 1971 and in the landslide election of 1989 – the first that led to a nejire kokkai ("twisted parliament": opposition control of the House of Councillors) – the main opposition Japan Socialist Party (JSP) managed to pick up a seat in Kagawa. Following the decline of the 1955 System of LDP and JSP and the party realignments of the 1990s, the JSP was replaced by the Democratic Party of Japan (DPJ) as main opposition party. DPJ candidate Emiko Uematsu could win Kagawa by a large margin against LDP incumbent Kenji Manabe in the 2007 election that also led to a nejire kokkai.

Current Councillors 
As of 31 January 2023, the current councillors representing this district are as follows:

 Shingo Miyake (Class of 2019, 2nd term, expires 2025)
 Yoshihiko Isozaki (Class of 2022, 3rd term, expires 2028)

Elected Councillors

Election Results

References 
 House of Councillors: Alphabetical list of former Councillors

Districts of the House of Councillors (Japan)